Hollywood Casino Amphitheatre may refer to:
 Hollywood Casino Amphitheatre (Tinley Park, Illinois)
 Hollywood Casino Amphitheatre (Maryland Heights, Missouri)